Count Luka Sorkočević (January 13, 1734 – September 11, 1789) was composer from the Republic of Ragusa. His music has been preserved, like other Sorkočević family possessions, in the archives of the Dubrovnik Franciscan convent. He is known as the first Croatian symphonist.

Biography
Luka (Lukša) Sorkočević was born in Dubrovnik and received an extensive education. His music teacher was the Italian composer Giuseppe Valenti, who was maestro di cappella of Dubrovnik Cathedral in the 1750s. He continued his education in Rome where he studied musical composition with Rinaldo di Capua. Later, Sorkočević married a girl from the Luccari (Lukarević) family and held several posts in various branches of Dubrovnik politics and society. During his relatively brief stint in Vienna as the ambassador to the imperial court he met several leading composers of his time, like Gluck and Haydn, and the famous poet Metastasio – a valuable experience for his later life and work. With serious health problems, he committed suicide by throwing himself from the third floor of his palace in Dubrovnik in 1789, at the age of 55.

Although he also wrote a few vocal pieces, his most interesting works are the eight symphonies, the violin sonata and the overture trio for the flute. These instrumental works belong to the transitional period between baroque and classicism. They can neither be associated with the empfindsamer Stil – indicated by the fact that they are exclusively written in major keys – nor with the modernism of the Mannheim school. Nevertheless, Sorkočević's music contains traces of both styles. The Largo of the Symphony No. 7 shows the kind of expression which is associated with the Empfindsamkeit and the first movement of the Symphony No. 1 contains the crescendi for which the Mannheim school was famous. The Sonata in A-major for piano was written in 1754.

See also
 Republic of Ragusa
 List of notable Ragusans
 Dubrovnik
 Dalmatia
 History of Dalmatia
 Antun Sorkočević
 House of Sorkočević

References

External sources
Biography in the Croatian Encyclopedia
Sorkočević and his instrumental works
Biography (in Croatian) 
Sorkočević's music review
Samples of Sorkočević's music

Croatian Baroque composers
Ragusan diplomats
Luka
People from Dubrovnik
1734 births
1789 deaths
Classical-period composers
Composers for cello
Composers for violin
Ragusan nobility
18th-century classical composers
18th-century male musicians
Male classical composers
18th-century Croatian nobility
18th-century suicides